Archeologia Viva (Italian: Archaeology Alive) is an Italian-language bimonthly magazine concerning archeology. It is headquartered in Florence, Italy.

History and profile
Archeologia Viva was established by Piero Pruneti in 1982. The magazine is published bimonthly by Giunti Gruppo Editoriale. The magazine organizes meetings on archeology and an annual archaeological film festival.

The frequent articles in Archeologia Viva include topics about prehistorical periods and the Middle Ages with particular attention to the classical civilizations of the Mediterranean. In each issue reports are published on major excavations, archaeological techniques, underwater archeology, museums and exhibitions in Italy and abroad.

See also
 List of magazines in Italy

References

External links
 Official website

1982 establishments in Italy
Archaeology magazines
Bi-monthly magazines published in Italy
Cultural magazines
Italian-language magazines
Magazines established in 1982
Magazines published in Florence